Kazz Magazine (sometimes stylized as KAZZ Magazine) is a Thai monthly fashion and lifestyle magazine owned by Haemarit Co., Ltd. covering topics about entertainment personalities and celebrities. The magazine is mainly read by a younger audience with a range of 18 to 28 years old and is mostly circulated within Bangkok and nearby areas.

The magazine also presents an annual entertainment award called Kazz Awards.

References

External links
 

Fashion magazines
Lifestyle magazines
Magazines published in Thailand
Magazines with year of establishment missing
Monthly magazines